Sibuyan striped shrew-rat (Chrotomys sibuyanensis) is a species of rodent in the family Muridae. The holotype was collected in 1992; however, it wasn't formally described until 2005.

References

Rats of Asia
Endemic fauna of the Philippines
Fauna of Romblon
Rodents of the Philippines
Chrotomys
Mammals described in 2005